Metadrinomyia is a genus of parasitic flies in the family Tachinidae. There are at least four described species in Metadrinomyia.

Species
These four species belong to the genus Metadrinomyia:
 Metadrinomyia argentea Shima, 1980
 Metadrinomyia flavifrons
 Metadrinomyia proclinata Shima, 1980
 Metadrinomyia xanthokolos

References

Further reading

 
 
 
 

Tachinidae
Articles created by Qbugbot